The European Latsis Prize is awarded annually by the European Science Foundation for "outstanding and innovative contributions in a selected field of European research". The prize is worth 100,000 Swiss francs and is awarded within a different discipline each year. The prize was inaugurated in 1999 by the Latsis Foundation and ended in 2012. The  prize was awarded in a different scientific field.

Winners

Notes and references

External links
European Science Foundation

Awards established in 1999
European science and technology awards